Buck Ryan was a UK newspaper adventure comic strip created by Jack Monk and the writer Don Freeman.

Monk and Freeman were doing an adaptation of Edgar Wallace's Terror Keep for the Daily Mirror. When it was dropped shortly due to a rights problem, Monk and Freeman decided to fashion their own strip, and Buck Ryan was born. It ran in the Daily Mirror from 22 March 1937 to July 1962.

Buck Ryan started again in the Daily Mirror 3 August 2015.

Characters and story
The two-fisted, brown-haired Buck, the strip's protagonist, is a young British private investigator who fights crime. His antagonists include the lady crime boss Twilight along with various kidnappers and German spies.

Twilight later reformed. She and Ryan were shown to be an item in at least one of the later stories and are shown to be about to kiss in some of the strip's panels.

Story Chronology

References

 

British comic strips
1937 comics debuts
1962 comics endings
Adventure comics
Crime comics
Detective comics
Drama comics
Ryan, Buck
Ryan, Buck
Ryan, Buck
Ryan, Buck